Francesco Pambianchi (born 12 January 1989) is an Italian professional footballer who plays as a centre back for Serie D club Casarano.

Career
Pambianchi began his career with the Parma youth system before being promoted to the first team in 2008.

Pambianchi moved to Pergocrema along with Niccolò Galli in co-ownership on 31 August 2009 for €250,000 each, as part of Diego Manzoni deal. In June 2011 he returned to Parma along with Galli for a total fee of €250,000 (€125,000 each for 50% rights), with Makris Petrozzi left for Pergocrema in co-ownership deal for the same price.

He was re-sold to SPAL in new co-ownership deal in July 2011, along with Alessandro Vecchi, for €250,000 and €200,000 respectively, and Davide Colomba joined Parma in definitive deal also for €450,000. After SPAL lost all their players due to financial irregularities, Parma loaned the player to Gubbio.

On 26 August 2013, he joined Foggia Calcio on loan.

On 8 June 2018, Catanzaro announced via their official website that they had signed Pambianchi for the 2018–19 season.

On 27 July 2019, he signed with Virtus Francavilla.

On 6 September 2021, he joined Casertana in Serie D. On 31 January 2022 Pambianchi moved to Monopoli.

On 19 July 2022, Pambianchi returned to Serie D and signed with Casarano.

References

External links
 Profile at Football.it
 FIGC 
 

1989 births
Living people
People from Urbino
Sportspeople from the Province of Pesaro and Urbino
Footballers from Marche
Italian footballers
Association football defenders
Serie B players
Serie C players
Lega Pro Seconda Divisione players
Serie D players
Parma Calcio 1913 players
U.S. Pergolettese 1932 players
S.P.A.L. players
A.S. Gubbio 1910 players
Calcio Foggia 1920 players
Taranto F.C. 1927 players
Rende Calcio 1968 players
U.S. Catanzaro 1929 players
Virtus Francavilla Calcio players
Casertana F.C. players
S.S. Monopoli 1966 players
Italy youth international footballers